"The Firing Squad" is a 1955 episode of the TV series Four Star Playhouse. It was based on the classic Canadian novel Execution. It was relocated to be set in the Australian army in World War Two, one of the rare depictions of Australia in Hollywood at the time.

Plot
In World War Two, a disgraced officer, Captain Adams, is ordered to lead a firing squad to execute a deserter, Jones who has been accused of murder. Jones is generally agreed to be innocent, but the army have decided to shoot him as an example.

Cast
David Niven as Adams
John Dehner as Gen. Hatfield
Hugh Beaumont as Padre
Michael Pate as Sgt. Gibbons
Jon Shepodd as Pvt. Jones
Tom Powers as Gen. Vincent
John Warburton as Col. Ramsey

Production
In the Los Angeles Times Niven describes his character as Canadian. But in the final play his character is Australian.

References

External links
The Firing Squad at IMDb
Full copy at Internet Archive

1955 television episodes
Black-and-white American television shows